Hope Island State Park may refer to:

Hope Island State Park (Mason County, Washington)
Hope Island State Park (Skagit County, Washington)